State Route 320 (SR 320) is a short north–south state highway in western Ohio, a U.S. state. The northern terminus of the state highway is located in New Paris at a signalized intersection with SR 121.

This L-shaped two-lane highway was first designated in the early 1930s along the stretch between Preble County Road 335 (CR 335) and SR 121. The highway was extended some three decades later along the former US 35 to its current southern terminus when the U.S. highway was re-routed onto the newly constructed I-70 freeway nearby. No direct access is provided between SR 320 and I-70/US 35. Consequently, one may access I-70 westbound from SR 320 via US 35. To get to I-70 eastbound from SR 320, one must follow CR 335 westbound into Indiana, where it becomes known as Eaton Pike, and connect to US 40 to access the freeway in the eastbound direction.

Route description

SR 320 is located entirely within the northwestern corner of Preble County.  The route begins at its intersection with US 35 south of where the U.S. route converges with I-70 at the Interstate's westernmost interchange in Ohio in Jackson Township.  SR 320 travels to the west-northwest through rural farmland prior to bending to the west into the hamlet of New Westville, where the highway encounters a primarily residential area.  At a four-way stop intersection there, SR 320 turns to the north, taking over for New Westville Road while CR 335 is the roadway that departs the intersection to the west.  SR 320 now turns to the north-northwest, passing amidst a number of houses prior to crossing over the I-70/US 35 concurrency.  To the north of the grade separation, SR 320 travels due north, and is bounded by homes and a large commercial facility on the west side, and farmland on the east side, with some batches of trees appearing along the way.  It intersects US 40, then proceeds into Jefferson Township.  A combination of woods and homes appear along the west side of the highway at this point, with more farmland abutting it to the east.  After a short reverse curve that takes the highway to the northeast and then back to the north, SR 320 encounters forested land on both sides.  Upon emerging from the wooded terrain, the highway enters New Paris.  As it follows Washington Street northerly through the village, SR 320 passes amidst a blend of commercial businesses and residences leading up to its endpoint in downtown New Paris at a signalized intersection where it meets SR 121. This state highway is not included within the National Highway System.

History
SR 320 first appeared in 1932, occupying the current stretch between its intersection with CR 335 (the former routing of US 35, which was originally designated as SR 11) and its current northern terminus at SR 121 in New Paris.  

When the current I-70 freeway was constructed going eastward from Indiana into Ohio in 1962, US 35 was re-routed onto the freeway.  As a result, SR 320 was extended southeasterly by approximately  along the former US 35 to the current junction of the two routes.

Major intersections

References

320
Transportation in Preble County, Ohio
U.S. Route 35